The Imperial Crown of the Holy Roman Empire, a hoop crown with a characteristic octagonal shape, was the coronation crown of the Holy Roman Emperor, probably from the late 10th century until the dissolution of the Holy Roman Empire in 1806. The crown was used in the coronation of the King of the Romans, the title assumed by the Emperor-elect immediately after his election. It is now kept in the Imperial Treasury (Kaiserliche Schatzkammer) at the Hofburg in Vienna, Austria.

History

The crown of eight hinged golden plates was probably made in Western Germany for the Imperial coronation of Otto I in 962, with later additions by Conrad II. The first preserved mention of it is from the 12th century, assuming (as is probable) it is the same crown.

Most Kings of the Romans were crowned with it until the end of the Holy Roman Empire. The crown was the most important item of the Imperial Regalia, which also included the Imperial Cross, the Imperial Sword, and the Holy Lance. During the coronation, it was given to the new king along with the sceptre and the Imperial Orb.

Heraldic crown of the German Empire

The Imperial Crown was the inspiration for the German State Crown designed in 1871 for the arms of the German Empire and its Emperor. The latter, however, had four half-arches supporting a small orb and cross, rather than the single arch and front cross of the original.

The changes were made to differentiate the Wilhelmine crown from the one kept in Vienna (outside the German Empire), while simultaneously invoking the powerful legacy of the Holy Roman Empire. A now-lost wooden model was made, but no actual crown was produced until the Empire's demise in 1918.

As a result it remained a heraldic crown only, even though it was also represented as if a real crown existed on that model, e.g. at the Niederwalddenkmal (1871-1883), in Hermann Wislicenus's "Apotheose of Empire" painting at the Imperial Palace of Goslar (ca. 1880), or on the Weidendammer Bridge in Berlin (1896).

Preservation

In 1349, Charles IV took the Imperial Regalia to the Karlštejn Castle near Prague, which he had just built for that purpose. in 1424, with Bohemia suffering the troubles of the Hussite Wars, Sigismund had them relocated to Visegrád and then to Nuremberg, where they were permanently kept in the Heilig-Geist-Spital except for the time of coronations (in Aachen until 1531, then in Frankfurt from 1562).

In 1796, as the war with revolutionary France was threatening the entire fabric of the Empire, the Regalia were brought for safety to Saint Emmeram's Abbey in Regensburg, and from there in 1800 to the Imperial capital in Vienna, where the Empire was abolished on 6 August 1806.

The crown and other Regalia remained in Vienna until the Anschluss of March 1938, when they were brought back to Nuremberg (this time in the Katharinenkirche) by Nazi Germany in line with their promotion of the city as repository of mythicized ancient German traditions. During World War II the crown was placed in the Historischer Kunstbunker, an underground vault of Nuremberg Castle. The American military recovered it with other treasures in August 1945, and returned it to the Oesterreichische Nationalbank in allied-occupied Austria in January 1946. It has been kept permanently in Vienna since that date. The Crown and Regalia were again on display at the Hofburg in 1954. The current display dates from a comprehensive refurbishment of the Hofburg's Treasury Vault in 1983-1987.

Design

The crown does not have a round shape but an octagonal one, a possible reference to the shape of crowns of Byzantine emperors and/or of Charlemagne's Palatine Chapel in Aachen. Its eight hinged plates are arched at the top. Two strips of iron of unidentified date, riveted with golden rivets to the plates, hold the crown together. Before the addition of the rings the plates were held together by long golden pins, which made it possible to separate the plates and the arch for easier transport.

Each plate of the crown is made out of a high carat gold, around 22 carats, which gives the crown a "buttery" colour, and is studded with pearls and precious stones. The stones are not cut into facets (a technique still unknown when the crown was made), but polished into rounded shapes and fixed en cabochon, i.e. put into openings that were cut into the metal, and fastened with thin wires. The effect is that when light shines in, the stones look as if they would shine from within.

The crown is decorated with 144 precious stones including sapphires, emeralds and amethysts (blue, green and purple precious stones being proper to emperors in Byzantine imperial protocol), and about the same number of pearls. Similar gem-studded decoration was used for other precious objects of the early and high Middle Ages, e.g. reliquaries, processional or altar crosses (crux gemmata), or precious book covers such as those of the Codex Aureus of St. Emmeram and Codex Aureus of Echternach.

The smaller four plaques, or 'picture-plates' (Bildplatten), bear pictorial representations of figures and scenes from the Bible and inscriptions in cloisonné enamel in Byzantine "sunk" (Senkschmelz) style. Each of these enamelled plates is surrounded by blue sapphires and pearls in raised filigree settings. 
 The Front Right Plate shows Christ in Majesty between two cherubim beneath the inscription in red enamel "By me kings reign" (P[er] ME REGES REGNANT; Proverbs 8:15). 
 The Back Right Plate shows the Prophet Isaiah standing and speaking to King Hezekiah, who is shown sitting on his bed. Isaiah holds a scroll with the words, "Behold, I will add fifteen years to your life" (II Kings 20:6). Above both Isaiah and Hezekiah are their names in red enamel (ISAIAS P[ro]PHETA · EZECHIAS REX). 
 The Front Left Plate shows King Solomon holding a scroll with the words, "Fear the Lord and flee from evil" (Proverbs 3:7), with his name above in red enamel "King Solomon" (REX SALOMON). 
 The Back Left Plate shows King David holding a scroll with the words, "The renowned king delights in doing justice" (Psalm 99:4), beneath the inscription naming him in red enamel (REX DAVID).

The other four plates, or 'stone-plates' (Steinplatten), are of various sizes and decorated solely with precious stone and pearls in raised filigree settings.  The twelve stones on the front and back plates are probably a direct reference to the twelve stones of the Jewish high priest's breastplate or hoshen (Exodus 39:9-14) and to the twelve foundation stones of the New Jerusalem in the Revelation to John (Revelation 21: 19-21).

The top central stone of the front plate is a triangular sapphire which replaces a famous stone, now lost, which was known as the Waise (i.e., the 'Orphan', because of its uniqueness), probably a large white opal with a wine-red fire or possibly a singularly brilliant garnet or red zircon and the subject of medieval lore. The medieval theologian and philosopher Albert the Great wrote about it in 1250:
The Orphan is a jewel in the crown of the Roman emperor. Because the like of it has never been seen elsewhere, it is called the "Orphan". It has the color of wine, of delicate red wine and it is as if the dazzling, white of snow penetrates the bright wine red and yet it remains dormant in this redness. The gem shines powerfully and it is said that it once even shone at night, but not in our time, but it is said to preserve the honour of the empire. 
When and why it was removed from the Imperial Crown is not known. The last mention of it is in an inventory ordered by Charles IV in 1350.

The crown has a single arch (or hoop) from the front to the back plate with the name and imperial style of Conrad II (1024-1039) in seed pearls  On the left side of this arch these seed pearls spell out the words "Conrad, by the Grace of God" (CHUONRADUS DEI GRATIA), while on the right side they read "Emperor of the Romans, Augustus" (ROMANORU[M] IMPERATOR AUG[USTUS]).  Above the front plate and in front of the arch is a jeweled cross with an engraving of the crucified Christ on its reverse side, originally a pectoral cross said to have belonged to Henry II and only later attached to the Imperial Crown. It is probable that both the arch and cross were added during Conrad II's reign.

There are three small holes on each of the two side stone-plates from which probably hung chains with pendant jewels, known as pendilia. These were a feature of the now-lost crown of Byzantine emperors, as in the mosaic portrait of Justinian I in the Basilica of San Vitale in Ravenna. Pendilia are still extant on the Holy Crown of Hungary, or the Crown of Constance of Aragon held in Palermo Cathedral.

The present red velvet cap on the inside of the crown dates from the 17th century. Before this the imperial crown was worn over a mitre; assuming this had the form of the Byzantine camelaucum, the arch would have caused it to bulge up on both sides, much as the embroidered ribbon from front to back on the eleventh century bishops' mitres caused their linen fabric to bulge up. Thus the Imperial Crown appears to be the earliest form of mitre crowns worn by the Holy Roman Emperors as a sign of their imperial office, the form of which was perpetuated in the crown created for Rudolf II and now known as the Imperial Crown of Austria.

Commemoration

An identical copy was made in 1915 by order of Wilhelm II for display in Aachen, where it is still kept in the Krönungssaal of Aachen Town Hall, built in the 14th century on the remains of Charlemagne's palace.

There are also copies of the crown and regalia in the Historical Museum of Frankfurt; in the fortress of Trifels in the former Electorate of the Palatinate; and in the Czech castle of Karlštejn, along with a copy of the Crown of Saint Wenceslas.

The Imperial Crown of the Holy Roman Empire was selected as the main motif for a high value commemorative coin, the €100 Imperial Crown of the Holy Roman Empire commemorative coin, minted in 2008. The obverse shows the Imperial Crown of the Holy Roman Empire. The reverse shows the Emperor Otto I with the Old St. Peter's Basilica in Rome in the background, where his coronation took place.

See also
 Imperial crown
 Crown of Charlemagne
 Imperial Crown of Austria
 Imperial Crowns of Charles VII
 Crown of Napoleon
 Crown of Wilhelm II

References

Notes

Bibliography

 Leithe-Jasper, Manfred (2005). The Kunsthistorisches Museum Vienna: The Imperial and Ecclesiastical Treasury. Scala Publisher. 

10th-century sculptures
Individual crowns
Imperial Regalia of the Holy Roman Empire
Ottonian sculptures
Medieval crowns